Rosedale is a valley located almost in the centre of the North York Moors national park in North Yorkshire, England. Rosedale is surrounded by moorland. At Dale Head is the source of the River Seven,which flows down the valley to join the River Rye at Little Habton near Malton. At its southern end Rosedale is squeezed between Spaunton Moor and Hartoft Rigg, where the river flows out through Forestry Commission woodland before passing the village of Cropton to reach the plains of the Vale of Pickering.

The modern village of Rosedale Abbey, built around the site of a former Cistercian Priory 
is the main settlement in the valley. There is also a small hamlet at Thorgill.

Natural England maps

Maps for Rosedale showing Access, Designations and other criteria from Natural England:

Rosedale Head maps

 MAGiC MaP : North York Moors – Rosedale Head.    

 MAGiC MaP : River Seven – Reeking Gill – Seavey Hill.     

 MAGiC MaP : Old Ralph cross – Young Ralph cross.

Rosedale Abbey maps

 MAGiC MaP : Thorgill – Rosedale Abbey.   

 MAGiC MaP : Thorgill – Rosedale West Side – Rosedale East Side.  

 MAGiC MaP : Rosedale Abbey – Listed buildings.  

 MAGiC MaP : Rosedale Abbey – PRIORY REMAINS.

Ironstone mine maps
 MAGiC MaP : Ironstone mine – Rosedale East.  

 MAGiC MaP : Ironstone mine – Rosedale West.

Name

Name history

There was no mention of Rosedale in the Domesday Book of 1086 A.D.

However the name Rozebi 
 
is shown in the paragraph for Pickering.

Survey of English Place-Names :

 Russedal(e) 1130
 Rossedal(e) 1186
 Rossdale 1328
 Rosedale, Rosedall 1376

Name toponym
The toponym might be:

 Russi's valley 
 Valley beside high but relatively level moorland promontory 

The name element dale is from Old Norse dalr or Middle English dale.
 

The name element rose is from Brittonic < rōs > and might be a reference to Blakey Ridge that defines the west side of the dale.

The name might have a Cornish influence since " Rose " place names are very common in Cornwall. 

The Cornish language was introduced into the area by the migration of tin miners from Cornwall. The majority of those came during the Cornish diaspora, 

however place name evidence suggests that Cornish miners might have arrived at an earlier date.

Examples of place names that might have a similar etymology:
 Raisdale, near Chop Gate in upper Bilsdale. 
 Roseberry Topping, North Yorkshire.
 Roose, Cumbria.
 Melrose, Scottish Borders.

History

Mining

The extraction of ironstone probably began during the Roman period.

In the late 19th century the valley quickly became a major centre for iron-ore extraction.

Mining took place from 1857 to 1928. The ore was pre-processed by calcination, for which special kilns were built.

The mines were served by the freight-only Rosedale Branch railway line that ran round the head of the valley, serving mine workings on either side, and across the moors to reach what is now the Esk Valley Line at Battersby Junction.
The railway line closed in 1929 after the last of the calcine dust extracted from the kiln waste had been sold.

Rosedale Chimney Bank, one of the steepest roads in the United Kingdom, provides a popular entrance point into the valley. A row of disused kilns and a former Royal Observer Corps Underground Monitoring Post are both situated yards from its summit.
In the adjacent Farndale Valley wild daffodils bloom around Easter time.

Governance (19th century)
Historically the governance of Rosedale was split east–west by the River Seven.

In the 19th century Rosedale East Side was in the parish of Middleton and the wapentake of Pickering – Lythe 
, while Rosedale West Side was in the parish of Lastingham and the wapentake of Ryedale.

Recent history

Few inhabitants of Rosedale work in farming. The majority of houses are bought as second homes and as such the permanent local population has been significantly reduced.

In mid-August Rosedale Show is held at Rosedale Abbey and attracts some 5,000 people from all parts of Britain. The show dates back to 1871 and is one of the oldest in North Yorkshire.

The Frank Elgee memorial was erected in 1953 at Blakey Ridge on The North York Moors, overlooking Loose Howe at Rosedale Head.

See also
 North Yorkshire
 North York Moors
 North Yorkshire County Council

References

Notes

Citations

Sources

External links 

 North York Moors, North York Moors National Park Authority
 The iron mining and railway community of Rosedale, Abandonedcommunities.co.uk (personal web site) 
 A Walk in Beautiful Rosedale, Walkingenglishman.com

Valleys of the North York Moors